The Sharpeville massacre occurred on 21 March 1960 at the police station in the township of Sharpeville in the then Transvaal Province of the then Union of South Africa (today part of Gauteng). After demonstrating against pass laws, a crowd of about 7,000  protesters went to the police station. Sources disagree as to the behaviour of the crowd: some state that the crowd was peaceful, while others state that the crowd had been hurling stones at the police and that the mood had turned "ugly". The South African Police (SAP) opened fire on the crowd when the crowd started advancing toward the fence around the police station; tear-gas had proved ineffectual. There were 249 victims in total, including 29 children, with 69 people killed and 180 injured. Some were shot in the back as they fled.

The massacre was photographed by photographer Ian Berry, who initially thought the police were firing blanks. In present-day South Africa, 21 March is celebrated as a public holiday in honour of human rights and to commemorate the Sharpeville massacre.

Life in Sharpeville before the massacre 
Sharpeville was first built in 1943 to replace Topville, a nearby township that suffered overcrowding where illnesses like pneumonia were widespread. Due to the illness, removals from Topville began in 1958. Approximately 10,000 Africans were forcibly removed to Sharpeville. Sharpeville had a high rate of unemployment as well as high crime rates. There were also youth problems because many children joined gangs and were affiliated with crimes instead of schools. Furthermore, a new police station was created, from which the police were energetic to check passes, deporting illegal residents, and raiding illegal shebeens.

Preceding events 

South African governments since the eighteenth century had enacted measures to restrict the flow of African South Africans into cities. Pass laws intended to control and direct their movement and employment were updated in the 1950s. Under the country's National Party government, African residents in urban districts were subject to influx control measures. Individuals over sixteen were required to carry passbooks, which contained an identity card, employment and influx authorisation from a labour bureau, name of employer and address, and details of personal history. Leading up to the Sharpeville massacre, the National Party administration under the leadership of Dr. Hendrik Verwoerd used these laws to enforce greater racial segregation and, in 1959–1960, extended them to include women. From the 1960s, the pass laws were the primary instrument used by the state to detain and harass its political opponents.

The African National Congress (ANC) prepared to initiate a campaign of protests against pass laws. These protests were to begin on 31 March 1960, but the rival Pan-Africanist Congress (PAC), led by Robert Sobukwe, decided to pre-empt the ANC by launching its own campaign ten days earlier, on 21 March, because they believed that the ANC could not win the campaign.

Massacre

On 21 March, 1960, a group of between 5,000 and 10,000 people converged on the local police station, offering themselves up for arrest for not carrying their passbooks. The Sharpeville police were not completely unprepared for the demonstration, as they had already driven smaller groups of more militant activists away the previous night.

PAC actively organized to increase turnout to the demonstration, distributing pamphlets and appearing in person to urge people not to go to work on the day of the protest. Many of the civilians present attended voluntarily to support the protest, but there is evidence that the PAC also used coercive means to draw the crowd there, including the cutting of telephone lines into Sharpeville, and preventing bus drivers from driving their routes.

By 10:00, a large crowd had gathered, and the atmosphere was initially peaceful and festive. Fewer than 20 police officers were present in the station at the start of the protest. Later the crowd grew to about 20,000, and the mood was described as "ugly", prompting about 130 police reinforcements, supported by four Saracen armoured personnel carriers, to be rushed in. The police were armed with firearms, including Sten submachine guns and Lee–Enfield rifles. There was no evidence that anyone in the gathering was armed with anything other than stones.

F-86 Sabre jets and Harvard Trainers approached to within  of the ground, flying low over the crowd in an attempt to scatter it. The protesters responded by hurling stones (striking three policemen) and rushing the police barricades. Police officers attempted to use tear gas to repel these advances, but it proved ineffectual, and the police fell back on the use of their batons. At about 13:00 the police tried to arrest a protester, and the crowd surged forward. The police began shooting shortly thereafter.

Death and injury toll
The official figure is that 69 people were killed, including 8 women and 10 children, and 180 injured, including 31 women and 19 children. The police shot many in the back as they turned to flee, causing some to be paralyzed.

Victims were buried en masse in a ceremony performed by clergy. Philip Finkie Molefe, responsible for establishing the first Assemblies of God church in the Vaal, was among the clergy that conducted the service.

Pretext for firing
Police reports in 1960 claimed that young and inexperienced police officers panicked and opened fire spontaneously, setting off a chain reaction that lasted about forty seconds. It is likely that the police were quick to fire as two months before the massacre, nine constables had been assaulted and killed, some disembowelled, during a raid at Cato Manor. Few of the policemen present had received public order training. Some of them had been on duty for over twenty-four hours without respite. Some insight into the mindset of those on the police force was provided by Lieutenant Colonel Pienaar, the commanding officer of the police reinforcements at Sharpeville, who said in his statement that "the native mentality does not allow them to gather for a peaceful demonstration. For them to gather means violence." He also denied giving any order to fire and stated that he would not have done so.

Other evidence given to the Truth and Reconciliation Commission "the evidence of Commission deponents reveals a degree of deliberation in the decision to open fire at Sharpeville and indicates that the shooting was more than the result of inexperienced and frightened police officers losing their nerve."

Response

The uproar among South Africa's black population was immediate, and the following week saw demonstrations, protest marches, strikes, and riots around the country. On 30 March 1960, the government declared a state of emergency, detaining more than 18,000 people, including prominent anti-apartheid activists who were known as members of the Congress Alliance including Nelson Mandela and some still enmeshed in the Treason Trial.

Many White South Africans were also horrified by the massacre. The poet Duncan Livingstone, a Scottish immigrant from the Isle of Mull who lived in Pretoria, wrote in response to the Massacre the Scottish Gaelic poem Bean Dubh a' Caoidh  a Fir a Chaidh a Marbhadh leis a' Phoileas ("A Black Woman Mourns her Husband Killed by the Police").

A storm of international protest followed the Sharpeville shootings, including sympathetic demonstrations in many countries and condemnation by the United Nations. On 1 April 1960, the United Nations Security Council passed Resolution 134. Sharpeville marked a turning point in South Africa's history; the country found itself increasingly isolated in the international community. The event also played a role in South Africa's departure from the Commonwealth of Nations in 1961.

The Sharpeville massacre contributed to the banning of the PAC and ANC as illegal organisations.  The massacre was one of the catalysts for a shift from passive resistance to armed resistance by these organisations. The foundation of Poqo, the military wing of the PAC, and Umkhonto we Sizwe, the military wing of the ANC, followed shortly afterwards.

Not all reactions were negative: embroiled in its opposition to the Civil Rights Movement, the Mississippi House of Representatives voted a resolution supporting the South African government "for its steadfast policy of segregation and the [staunch] adherence to their traditions in the face of overwhelming external agitation."

Commemoration
Since 1994, 21 March has been commemorated as Human Rights Day in South Africa.

Sharpeville was the site selected by President Nelson Mandela for the signing into law of the Constitution of South Africa on 10 December 1996.

In 1998, the Truth and Reconciliation Commission (TRC) found that the police actions constituted "gross human rights violations in that excessive force was unnecessarily used to stop a gathering of unarmed people."

On 21 March 2002, the 42nd anniversary of the massacre, a memorial was opened by former President Nelson Mandela as part of the Sharpeville Human Rights Precinct.

International Day for the Elimination of Racial Discrimination 
UNESCO marks 21 March as the yearly International Day for the Elimination of Racial Discrimination, in memory of the massacre.

References in art and literature
The Afrikaner poet Ingrid Jonker mentioned the Sharpeville Massacre in her verse.

The event was an inspiration for painter Oliver Lee Jackson in his Sharpeville Series from the 1970s.

Ingrid de Kok was a child living on a mining compound near Johannesburg where her father worked at the time of the Sharpeville massacre. In her moving poem “ Our Sharpeville” she reflects on the atrocity through the eyes of a child.

Max Roach's 1960 Album We Insist! Freedom Now Suite includes the composition Tears for Johannesburg in response to the massacre.

See also

 List of massacres in South Africa
 1922 Turin massacre, a similar event in Italy
 Polish 1970 protests, a similar event in Poland
 2018–2019 Gaza border protests, a similar toll over months at the Gaza-Israeli border. 
 Bodo League massacre, a similar event in South Korea
 Thammasat University massacre, a similar event in Thailand
 February 28 incident, a similar event in Taiwan
 Wanpaoshan Incident, a similar event in Eastern Asia
 Marikana massacre – August 2012 police shooting of approximately 34 striking miners widely compared to Sharpeville
 Sharpeville Six – six people convicted from a demonstration in Sharpeville in 1984 which drew international attention
 United Nations Security Council Resolution 610
 United Nations Security Council Resolution 615
 Year of Africa
 Bulhoek massacre

References

 
1960 protests
Massacres in 1960
1960 in South Africa
Opposition to apartheid in South Africa
Events associated with apartheid
Protests in South Africa
Sharpeville
Mass murder in 1960
Protest-related deaths
Killings by law enforcement officers in South Africa
March 1960 events in Africa
1960 murders in South Africa